The 2018–19 season was Gillingham's 126th season in their existence and sixth consecutive season in League One. Along with League One, the club also participated in the FA Cup, EFL Cup and EFL Trophy.

The season covers the period from 1 July 2018 to 30 June 2019.

Transfers

Transfers in

Transfers out

Loans in

Loans out

Competitions

Friendlies
In May 2018, friendlies with Folkestone Invicta, Faversham Town, Margate, Tonbridge Angels and  Eastleigh were announced.

League One

League table

Results summary

Matches
On 21 June 2018, the League One fixtures for the season were announced.

FA Cup

The first round draw was made live on BBC by Dennis Wise and Dion Dublin on 22 October. The draw for the second round was made live on BBC and BT by Mark Schwarzer and Glenn Murray on 12 November. The third round draw was made live on BBC by Ruud Gullit and Paul Ince from Stamford Bridge on 3 December 2018. The fourth round draw was made live on BBC by Robbie Keane and Carl Ikeme from Wolverhampton on 7 January 2019.

EFL Cup

On 15 June 2018, the draw for the first round was made in Vietnam.

EFL Trophy
On 13 July 2018, the initial group stage draw bar the U21 invited clubs was announced.

References

Gillingham F.C. seasons
Gillingham